The Women's downhill competition of the Squaw Valley 1960 Olympics was held at Squaw Valley on Saturday, February 20.

The defending world champion was Lucille Wheeler of Canada, who had retired the previous year; defending Olympic champion Madeleine Berthod of Switzerland did not compete in this event.

Nineteen-year-old Heidi Biebl of Germany won the gold medal, while American Penny Pitou was a second behind for the silver; the bronze medalist was Traudl Hecher of Austria.

Helmets
This was the first Olympic downhill in which crash helmets were mandatory, following the race death in 1959 of Canadian John Semmelink at Garmisch, West Germany. During his final race, Semmelink wore a leather helmet, which was more protection than many racers used at the time. The U.S. Ski Team first wore crash helmets at the 1956 Winter Olympics, but most of the Europeans went without.

Results
Saturday, February 20, 1960
The race was started at 10:00 local time, (UTC −8).

References 

Women's downhill
Oly
Alp